Godefroy Engelmann (August 17, 1788 – April 25, 1839) was a Franco-German lithographer and chromolithographer.

Biography

Godefroy Engelmann was born in 1788 in Mühlhausen, a small town near the France/Switzerland/Germany border. At the time of his birth Mulhouse was a free German republic associated with the Swiss Confederation, but was annexed by France 10 years later. He died in that same town in 1839, from a tumor in his neck.

Engelmann trained in Switzerland and France at La Rochelle and Bordeaux, and he studied painting and sketching in Jean-Baptiste Regnault's atelier in Paris. In the summer of 1814 he travelled to Munich, Germany to study lithography, a German invention. The following spring, he founded La Société Lithotypique de Mulhouse. In June 1816 he opened a workshop in Paris.

Engelmann is largely credited with bringing lithography to France, and later, commercializing chromolithography. In 1837 he was granted an English patent for a process of chromolithography that provided consistently high-quality results.

Throughout his life, he produced large numbers of prints, including numerous plates for Baron Isidore Justin Séverin Taylor's celebrated collection of lithographs, "".

Engelmann's Paris printing company, "" was passed on to his son, Godefroy Engelmann II (born 1819), who carried on his father's work with the same high artistic quality until his own death in 1897.

Notes

References
The Cleveland Museum of Art - 8 artist works
Nederlands Steendrukmuseum / Dutch Museum of Lithography

Further reading
 Tanya Szrajber, 'Documents on Godefroy Engelmann’s Chromolithographie', Print Quarterly, XXVIII, 2011, pp. 414–17.

External links
 Pictures and texts of Lettres sur la Suisse by Godefroy Engelmann (et al.) can be found in the database VIATIMAGES.

1788 births
1839 deaths
Artists from Mulhouse
French draughtsmen
19th-century French engravers
19th-century French lithographers
19th-century French male artists
19th-century French inventors